In mathematics, the plastic number  (also known as the plastic constant, the plastic ratio, the minimal Pisot number, the platin number, Siegel's number or, in French) is a mathematical constant which is the unique real solution of the cubic equation
 

It has the exact value
 

Properties

Recurrences
Hence it is the limiting ratio of successive terms of any (non-zero) integer sequence satisfying this recurrence such as the Padovan sequence (also known as the Cordonnier numbers), the Perrin numbers and the Van der Laan numbers, and bears relationships to these sequences akin to the relationships of the golden ratio to the second-order Fibonacci and Lucas numbers, akin to the relationships between the silver ratio and the Pell numbers.

The plastic number satisfies the nested radical recurrence

Number theory
Because the plastic number has the minimal polynomial  it is also a solution of the polynomial equation  for every polynomial  that is a multiple of  but not for any other polynomials with integer coefficients. Since the discriminant of its minimal polynomial is −23, its splitting field over rationals is  This field is also a Hilbert class field of  As such, it can be expressed in terms of the Dedekind eta function  with argument ,

and root of unity . Similarly, for the supergolden ratio with argument ,

Also, the plastic number is the smallest Pisot–Vijayaraghavan number. Its algebraic conjugates are
 
of absolute value ≈ 0.868837 . This value is also  because the product of the three roots of the minimal polynomial is 1.

Trigonometry
The plastic number can be written using the hyperbolic cosine and its inverse:

(See Cubic function#Trigonometric (and hyperbolic) method.)

Geometry

There are precisely three ways of partitioning a square into three similar rectangles:
The trivial solution given by three congruent rectangles with aspect ratio 3:1.
The solution in which two of the three rectangles are congruent and the third one has twice the side length of the other two, where the rectangles have aspect ratio 3:2.
The solution in which the three rectangles are all of different sizes and where they have aspect ratio ρ2. The ratios of the linear sizes of the three rectangles are: ρ (large:medium); ρ2 (medium:small); and ρ3 (large:small). The internal, long edge of the largest rectangle (the square's fault line) divides two of the square's four edges into two segments each that stand to one another in the ratio ρ. The internal, coincident short edge of the medium rectangle and long edge of the small rectangle divides one of the square's other, two edges into two segments that stand to one another in the ratio ρ4.
The fact that a rectangle of aspect ratio ρ2 can be used for dissections of a square into similar rectangles is equivalent to an algebraic property of the number ρ2 related to the Routh–Hurwitz theorem: all of its conjugates have positive real part.

History and names 

Dutch architect and Benedictine monk Dom Hans van der Laan gave the name plastic number to this number in 1928. In 1924, four years prior to van der Laan's naming, French engineer  had already discovered the number and referred to it as the radiant number. Unlike the names of the golden ratio and silver ratio, the word plastic was not intended by van der Laan to refer to a specific substance, but rather in its adjectival sense, meaning something that can be given a three-dimensional shape. Van der Laan designed the 1967 St. Benedictusberg Abbey church to these plastic number proportions.

The plastic number is also sometimes called the silver number, a name given to it by Midhat J. Gazalé and subsequently used by Martin Gardner, but that name is more commonly used for the silver ratio   one of the ratios from the family of metallic means first described by Vera W. de Spinadel in 1998.

See also 
Snub icosidodecadodecahedron
Supergolden ratio

Notes

References

.
.
.
.

External links
Tales of a Neglected Number by Ian Stewart
Plastic rectangle and Padovan sequence at Tartapelago by Giorgio Pietrocola

Euclidean plane geometry
Cubic irrational numbers
Mathematical constants
History of geometry
Visual arts theory
Composition in visual art